Certain Women is a 2016 American drama film edited, written, and directed by Kelly Reichardt. Based on Native Sandstone, Travis, B. and Tome—three short stories from Maile Meloy's collections Half in Love and Both Ways Is the Only Way I Want It—it stars Laura Dern, Kristen Stewart, Michelle Williams, Lily Gladstone, James Le Gros, and Jared Harris.

It had its world premiere at the 2016 Sundance Film Festival on January 24, 2016, and was released theatrically in the United States on October 14, 2016, by IFC Films. It grossed $1,068,054 domestically, becoming Reichardt's highest-grossing film to date.

Plot
In Livingston, Montana, attorney Laura Wells has been dealing with a disgruntled client, Fuller, for eight months. Unemployed due to a workplace injury that rendered him disabled, he has taken to visiting Laura repeatedly at her office. As Fuller will not listen to her advice, she takes him to another lawyer. After assessing the case, the lawyer tells Fuller exactly what Laura had told him; that while Fuller's company was clearly at fault for his injuries, Fuller can no longer sue the company, because he previously had accepted their initial small settlement. On his way home from the meeting with the second lawyer, Fuller feuds with his wife, and is kicked out of their car. He takes a ride home with Laura Wells. On the way he tells Laura that he wants to shoot his former employers.

Late that same night, Laura is called by the police. Fuller has gone back to his former place of employment and has taken a security guard as hostage. After being prepped by the police, Laura agrees to talk to Fuller. She goes into the building and finds Fuller with his hostage; Fuller has her locate his employee records, which include the case file that the company used to settle his disability claim. Fuller has Laura read the entire file, which details clearly how Fuller was cheated out of his rightful settlement. Fuller decides to let the guard go; He asks Laura to stall for him by going to the front and telling the police of his demands as if he has a gun pointed at her, while he slips out the back. Instead, Laura immediately tells the police where Fuller is and he is arrested.

Gina and Ryan Lewis are a married couple with a teenage daughter, building their own home from the ground up. Gina feels that Ryan constantly undermines her with their daughter and is annoyed by his behavior. On their way home from the campsite of their new home, they decide to stop at the home of Albert, an elderly man they know, to try to persuade him to sell them the sandstone on his property. As they talk, Gina tries to persuade Albert to sell her the sandstone, but he seems unfocused and only interested in talking with Ryan. Eventually Albert tentatively agrees to give the sandstone to Gina and Ryan. Gina, who has been secretly recording the conversation, signals that they should leave. In the car on their way home, Gina complains about Ryan's lack of support during the negotiation and they debate whether taking the sandstone is the right decision.

Sometime later, Gina and Ryan arrive and load up a truck full of the sandstone. She notices Albert watching from his window and waves at him but he does not wave back.

Jamie is a ranch hand living in isolation during the winter, tending to horses on a farm outside of Belfry. Heading into town one night, she sees cars turning into the school and follows them. She learns that she has stumbled onto a class on education law taught by a young lawyer, Beth Travis. Jamie goes out to eat with Beth after class.  Beth explains that she lives in Livingston, which is a four-hour drive away, so she must make the eight-hour round trip twice a week to make it back in time for her real job.

Despite having no interest in education law, Jamie returns to class week after week. One week she brings one of her horses to class, and she and Beth ride the horse to the diner. The following week, she is stunned when she learns Beth has quit and a new teacher is brought in as a permanent replacement. Jamie then immediately leaves the class and drives straight to Livingston. Spending the night in her car, she spends the morning driving to law offices hoping to find Beth. On the way, she has flashbacks of the previous time she drove to the city. Locating her address, Jamie sees Beth in the parking lot, and tells her that she drove over knowing that if she didn't, she would never see her again. Beth fails to respond and Jamie leaves. On her way home, she falls asleep at the wheel and drives into an empty field.

Some time later, Laura visits Fuller in prison. He says he understands how she acted and asks her to answer his letters just so as not to feel so lonely. She agrees. Gina has a barbecue with friends at her land and her husband appreciates her work. She looks at the sandstone and smiles. Jamie continues working at the ranch.

Cast

Production
Reichardt had shot most of her feature-film work in Oregon and wanted a change of setting. She intertwined three of Meloy's short stories set in Montana, and after scouting locations, felt that Livingston, rather than Meloy's home town of Helena, was ideal for the film's look. The production team included Neil Kopp and Vincent Savino with Todd Haynes as executive producer. The principals, including two-time collaborator Michelle Williams, were cast in 2015. Haynes noted that the shots in Certain Women compartmentalized the women's lives—the isolation and loneliness they felt—even though each story dealt with relationships. To emphasize this, Reichardt set up shots with door frames, windows, mirrors and architectural structures separating and fragmenting her characters in the frame. She used location sounds, such as wind and train whistles, throughout the film; only one scene has a film score.

Release
Certain Women had its world premiere at the 2016 Sundance Film Festival on January 24, 2016. Shortly after, IFC Films acquired U.S distribution rights to the film. Prior to the films premiere at Sundance, Sony Pictures Worldwide Acquisitions acquired international distribution rights to the film. The film went onto screen at the Toronto International Film Festival, the New York Film Festival, and The Art of Brooklyn Film Festival. The film was released on October 14, 2016.

Reception

Critical response
The film received critical acclaim upon its Sundance premiere. Rotten Tomatoes lists the film as "certified fresh" and rates it 92% out of 192 reviews posted, with an average score of 7.8 out of 10. The website's critical consensus reads, "Certain Women further demonstrates writer-director Kelly Reichardt's gift for telling the stories of ordinary people with uncommon empathy and skill." On Metacritic, the film has a score of 82 out of 100, based on 38 critics, indicating "universal acclaim".

Noel Murray at The Playlist graded it an A- and called the film "utterly enthralling" while praising the "mesmerizing effect" of the slow pacing. Guy Lodge raved about the film with particular praise for director Reichardt whom he called the "quietest of great American filmmakers". Nigel M. Smith of The Guardian gave the film 4 out of 5 stars and praised Reichardt as "a master at slow-burning, melancholic dramas". Leslie Felperin at The Hollywood Reporter was more mixed on the film praising the final section of the film as an "exquisite tale" and especially enjoying "luminous newcomer" Lily Gladstone but called the film as a whole "a trifle academic and dry".

In France Les Cahiers du cinéma placed the film third on their 2017 Top Ten chart (just after Twin Peaks (2017 TV series) and Jeannette: The Childhood of Joan of Arc).

Accolades

References

External links

Certain Women: Trapped Under the Big Sky an essay by Ella Taylor at the Criterion Collection

American drama films
American independent films
American anthology films
Best Film, London Film Festival winners
Films directed by Kelly Reichardt
Films set in Montana
Films about lawyers
Films shot in Montana
Stage 6 Films films
Films shot in 16 mm film
2010s feminist films
2016 films
2016 drama films
2016 independent films
2010s English-language films
2010s American films